"The Rolling English Road" is one of the best-known poems by G. K. Chesterton. It was first published under the title "A Song of Temperance Reform" in the New Witness in 1913. It was also included in the novel by Chesterton, The Flying Inn, in 1914.

The poem is written in heptameters. Alliteration is plentiful and "a particularly useful device in the last line of each stanza, playfully yoking the far-flung places together (Birmingham/Beachy Head, etc) and reminding us that, like a pub comic, our narrator is, supposedly, improvising his tall story. When he drops the alliterative yoke in the last stanza ("Paradise ... Kensal Green") you know he's being serious."

In the final line of the poem, Kensal Green refers to Kensal Green Cemetery in London.

A restaurant in the local area, on Chamberlayne road, uses most of the last stanza, "Paradise by way of Kensal Green" as its name.

See also
Byway (road)

References

External links

 G. K. Chesterton's Works on the Web
 

1914 poems
Poems by G. K. Chesterton